WSNT (1490 AM) is a radio station broadcasting a country music format. Licensed to Sandersville, Georgia, United States.  The station is currently owned by Radio Station Wsnt, Inc.

History
The station went on the air as DWSNT on 2005-03-17.  On 2007-01-31, the station changed its call sign to the current WSNT.

References

External links

SNT
Radio stations established in 2005